Axel Theodor Klaus Milberg (born 1 August 1956) is a German actor. His most prominent role is that of Tatort investigator Klaus Borowski.

Selected filmography
 After Five in the Forest Primeval (1995)
  (1996)
 Father's Day (1996)
 It Happened in Broad Daylight (1997, TV film)
 Der Campus (1998)
  (1999)
 Leo & Claire (2001)
 Tatort (since 2003, TV series)
  (2004, TV film)
  (2008, TV film)
  (2010, TV film)
  (2011, TV film)
 Hunkeler und die Augen des Ödipus (2012, TV film)
 Hannah Arendt (2012)
 Wetlands (2013)
Cape Town (2016, TV series)

External links

Living people
German male television actors
German male film actors
20th-century German male actors
21st-century German male actors
1956 births
Actors from Kiel